Scott David Brown (born 25 November 1994) is a Scottish professional footballer who plays for Raith Rovers as a midfielder.

Career
Following a trial in June 2011, Brown moved from Clyde to Bradford City in July 2011. He made his senior debut for them in a 1–1 draw against Northampton Town in the FA Cup on 3 November 2012. He was offered a professional contract by the club on 11 April 2013, alongside Louie Swain. In July 2013, it was announced that Brown was close to transferring to Scottish club St Johnstone, and Bradford City's official website confirmed he would not be given a 2013–14 squad number because of the proposed move. The deal was completed later that month.

Brown made his St Johnstone debut on 5 October 2013 against Inverness Caledonian Thistle in the Premiership, coming on as a substitute for David Wotherspoon in the 86th minute. He scored his first senior goal on 7 May 2014 in St Johnstone's 3–3 draw at home to Celtic.

He signed for Dumbarton on loan on 20 August 2015. He left at the end of his loan deal in January 2016.

He moved to Raith Rovers in May 2022.

Career statistics

References

1994 births
Living people
Scottish footballers
Clyde F.C. players
Bradford City A.F.C. players
St Johnstone F.C. players
Dumbarton F.C. players
Scottish Professional Football League players
Association football midfielders
Peterhead F.C. players
Raith Rovers F.C. players